HNLMS Evertsen (F815) was a frigate of the . The ship was in service with the Royal Netherlands Navy from 1967 to 1989. The ship's radio call sign was "PAVG". She was sold to the Indonesian Navy where the ship was renamed KRI Abdul Halim Perdanakusuma (355).

Design and construction
In the early 1960s, the Royal Netherlands Navy had an urgent requirement to replace its s, obsolete ex-American escorts built during the Second World War. To meet this requirement, it chose to build a modified version of the British  as its , using broadly the same armament as the original design, but where possible, substituting Dutch electronics and radars.

Displacement was  standard and  full load.

A twin 4.5-inch (113 mm) Mark 6 gun mount was fitted forward. Anti-aircraft defence was provided by two quadruple Sea Cat surface-to-air missile launchers on the hangar roof. A Limbo anti-submarine mortar was fitted aft to provide a short-range anti-submarine capability, while a hangar and  helicopter deck allowed a single Westland Wasp helicopter to be operated, for longer range anti-submarine and anti-surface operations.

As built, Evertsen was fitted with a Signaal LW-03 long range air search radar on the ship's mainmast, with a DA02 medium range air/surface surveillance radar carried on the ship's foremast. M44 and M45 fire control radars were provided for the Seacat missiles and ships guns respectively. The ship had a sonar suite of Type 170B attack sonar and Type 162 bottom search sonar. The ship had a crew of 251.

Modifications
All six Van Speijks were modernised in the 1970s, using many of the systems used by the new s. The 4.5-inch gun was replaced by a single OTO Melara 76 mm and launchers for up to eight Harpoon anti-ship missiles fitted (although only two were normally carried). The hangar and flight deck were enlarged, allowing a Westland Lynx helicopter to be carried, while the Limbo mortar was removed, with a pair of triple Mk 32 torpedo launchers providing close-in anti-submarine armament. A Signaal DA03 radar replaced the DA02 radar and an American EDO Corporation CWE-610 sonar replaced the original British sonar. Evertsen was modernised at the Den Helder naval dockyard between 13 or 18 July 1979 and 26 November 1982. Evertsen and Isaac Sweers also received AN/SQR-18A towed array sonar system. The system was removed when the ships was sold to Indonesia.

Dutch service history
An order for four Van Speijks was placed in 1962, with two more, including Evertsen, ordered in 1964. The ship was built at KM de Schelde in Vlissingen. The keel laying took place on 6 July 1965 and the launching on 8 June 1966. The ship was put into service on 21 December 1967 with the pennant number F815.

The ship received a mid-life modernization in Den Helder, starting on 13 or 18 July 1979 and lasting till 26 November 1982. The completion of modernization was delayed by around eight months from intended due to lack of civilian labor in naval dockyards.

Evertsen was decommissioned in 1989 and along with Isaac Sweers were sold to Indonesia. She was transferred to the Indonesian Navy on 1 November 1989.

Indonesian service history
On 13 May 1989, Indonesia and the Netherlands signed an agreement for transfer of the last two Van Speijk-class ships. The ship was transferred to Indonesia on 1 November 1989 and renamed as KRI Abdul Halim Perdanakusuma, assigned with pennant number 355.

By 2002, the ships Seacat missiles were inoperable and it was reported that propulsion problems were badly effecting the availability of the ships of this class. The ship's Seacat launchers were therefore replaced by two Simbad twin launchers for Mistral anti-aircraft missiles, and Abdul Halim Perdanakusuma was re-engined with  Caterpiller 3616 diesel engines. As the Indonesian Navy retired Harpoon missile from its stockpiles, Abdul Halim Perdanakusuma was rearmed with Chinese C-802 missiles.

Notes

Bibliography 

 

 

Van Speijk-class frigates
1966 ships
Ships built in Vlissingen
Frigates of the Indonesian Navy